KMDY is a Christian radio station licensed to Keokuk, Iowa, broadcasting on 90.9 MHz FM.  KMDY serves the areas of Keokuk, Iowa, Fort Madison, Iowa, and Carthage, Illinois. The station is owned by Sound in Spirit Broadcasting, Inc.

KMDY began broadcasting in 2001, and was owned by Moody Bible Institute, running 30 watts. In 2005, KMDY was purchased by Cornerstone Community Radio. In 2006, its power was increased to 7,700 watts.

Effective December 28, 2018, Cornerstone Community Radio sold KMDY and translator W209CH to Sound in Spirit Broadcasting, Inc. for $150,000.

Translators
KMDY is also heard in Quincy, Illinois through a translator on 89.7 FM.

References

External links
KMDY's official website

MDY
Radio stations established in 2001
2001 establishments in Iowa